William E. Grady Career and Technical Education High School is a public, Career and Technical Education (CTE) high school located at 25 Brighton 4th Road, Brighton Beach, Brooklyn, New York, USA. It is a part of region 7 in the New York City Department of Education. Grady High School was established in 1941. 

It offers three-year programs in automotive technology, construction, culinary, healthcare and IT. While the school was slated for closure in 2010 due to poor performance, the performance improved and in April 2012 they announced it would remain open.

Notable alumni
KRS-One, Grammy-nominated rapper, co-founder of Boogie Down Productions (attended)
Rolando Blackman is a retired professional basketball player. He was a four-time All-Star who spent most of his career with the Dallas Mavericks.
Tony Lo Bianco is an American actor in films and television
Quincy Douby drafted first round, 19th pick by the Sacramento Kings in the 2006 NBA draft. Currently playing overseas.
Normal Richardson

References

External links

Public high schools in Brooklyn
Brighton Beach